Bernard Kelly (1808 – 1 January 1887) was an Irish nationalist politician who served as the first Irish Parliamentary Party MP for the constituency of South Donegal in the House of Commons of the United Kingdom of Great Britain and Ireland.  He was first elected in the 1885 general election and re-elected in the general election of 1886.  He died in office in 1887.

Kelly is buried at Ballyshannon, Co. Donegal where his headstone reads:

References

External links 

1808 births
1887 deaths
UK MPs 1885–1886
UK MPs 1886–1892
Irish Parliamentary Party MPs
Members of the Parliament of the United Kingdom for County Donegal constituencies (1801–1922)
People from Ballyshannon
Politicians from County Donegal